The Carousel of Death (German: Das Karussell des Todes) is a 1928 German silent film directed by Heinz Paul and starring Claire Rommer, Anton Pointner and Jean Murat.

The film's art direction was by Otto Erdmann and Hans Sohnle.

Cast
 Claire Rommer 
 Anton Pointner 
 Jean Murat 
 Angelo Ferrari 
 Erich Kaiser-Titz

References

Bibliography
 Alfred Krautz. International directory of cinematographers, set- and costume designers in film, Volume 4. Saur, 1984.

External links

1928 films
Films of the Weimar Republic
German silent feature films
Films directed by Heinz Paul
German black-and-white films